Opportunity Classes (OC classes) in New South Wales, Australia are government primary school classes operated by the New South Wales Department of Education and Communities for gifted and talented children.

History
Opportunity classes have a long history in NSW, with the first ones established in 1932. The impact of attending Opportunity classes varies with individual students, with some reporting negative experiences, while others report a strong sense of community and wellbeing.

Opportunity classes have been regarded by some parents as feeder schools for selective schools; however, not all students in opportunity classes successfully gain admission to selective schools. Not all Opportunity Class (OC) students apply to attend a selective high school, as in some areas attending a selective high school means either long daily commutes or living away from home. The reality is that entry to both OC and Selective High School classes is via standardized testing that focuses on ability in mathematics, english and general ability (basically an IQ-style test), and that there are fewer places available for entry to OC (~1800) than to Selective High School (4214 places in 2015), so in theory it is 'harder' to gain entry into OC than Selective High School and a large percentage of students attending OC classes gain entry to Selective High School, or gain a scholarship to a private high school.

Admission
Parents of prospective applicants for opportunity classes complete an "Intention to Apply" form provided by the school, then complete an online application. Prospective applicants undertake an aptitude test, consisting of mathematics and English literacy components, the marks for which are sent with assessment scores based on the student's performance in Years 3 and 4 by the applicant's school principal.

List of schools with opportunity classes
The following schools offer admission to opportunity classes in Year 5 & 6.

Alexandria Park Community School
Alstonville Public School
Artarmon Public School
Ashfield Public School 
Balgowlah Heights Public School
Balmain Public School
Bathurst West Public School
Beecroft Public School
Biraban Public School
Blacktown South Public School
Blaxcell Street Public School
Bradbury Public School
Camden South Public School
Caringbah North Public School
Casula Public School
Cessnock West Public School
Chatswood Public School
Colyton Public School
Coonabarabran Public School
Cudgegong Valley Public School
Dubbo West Public School
Dural Public School
Earlwood Public School
Ermington Public School
Georges Hall Public School
Glenbrook Public School
Goonellabah Public School
Gosford Public School
Goulburn West Public School
Greenacre Public School
Greystanes Public School
Harrington Street Public School
Holsworthy Public School
Hurstville Public School
Illaroo Road Public School
Ironbark Ridge Public School
Jewells Public School
Kingswood Public School
Leumeah Public School
Lithgow Public School
Maryland Public School
Matthew Pearce Public School
Mona Vale Public School
Moree Public School
Neutral Bay Public School
Newbridge Heights Public School
New Lambton South Public School
North Rocks Public School
Picnic Point Public School
Port Macquarie Public School
Quakers Hill Public School
Queanbeyan South Public School
Richmond Public School
Rutherford Public School
Ryde Public School
Smithfield Public School
Soldiers Point Public School
South Grafton Public School
St Andrews Public School
St Johns Park Public School
Sturt Public School
Summer Hill Public School
Sutherland Public School
Tahmoor Public School
Tamworth Public School
Tamworth South Public School
Tighes Hill Public School
Toormina Public School
Waitara Public School
Wentworth Falls Public School
Wilkins Public School
Wollongong Public School
Woollahra Public School
Wyong Public School

See also
National Assessment Program – Literacy and Numeracy (NAPLAN)
Selective school (New South Wales)

References

External links
Primary schools with opportunity classes — Department of Education and Communities
Selective High Schools and Opportunity Classes: some facts — Department of Education and Communities

Opportunity Class Placement Test